"Cherry Bomb" is a song by American rock singer John Mellencamp. It was released as the second single from Mellencamp's ninth studio album, The Lonesome Jubilee (1987). "Cherry Bomb" is a nostalgic song that reflects on Mellencamp's teenage years hanging out at the Last Exit Teen Club. The single was released in the United States in October 1987, backed with the B-side "Shama Lama Ding Dong".

Upon its release, "Cherry Bomb" reached number one on the Billboard Album Rock Tracks chart, number 12 on the Adult Contemporary chart, and number eight on the Hot 100. Internationally, "Cherry Bomb" peaked at number four in New Zealand and number five in Canada, earning a gold certification in the latter country. The music video for the song features a couple dancing intimately with one another near a jukebox while Mellencamp dances by himself, interspersed with vintage video clips.

Background
"Cherry Bomb" features a female voice (Mellencamp background singer Crystal Taliefero) and two other male voices (band members Toby Myers and Mike Wanchic) in addition to Mellencamp's on the second verse. Mellencamp told GQ magazine in 2022 what inspired him to have voices other than his own take turns singing lead: "Sly and the Family Stone. He had all those hit records when I was in junior high, and I love the fact that all the sudden there's a female voice, then a male voice."

Charts

Weekly charts

Year-end charts

Certifications

References

John Mellencamp songs
1987 singles
1987 songs
Mercury Records singles
Song recordings produced by Don Gehman
Songs written by John Mellencamp